Lincoln is a city in Placer County, California, United States, part of the Sacramento metropolitan area.

Lincoln is part of the Sacramento-Roseville Metropolitan Statistical Area.

History 

The original townsite was surveyed and laid out in 1859 by Theodore Judah along the proposed line of the California Central Railroad. The name Lincoln was conferred in honor of Charles Lincoln Wilson, one of the organizers, a fundraiser, and a management contractor of the California Central Railroad (CCRR). The CCRR was planned as a rail link between the cities of Marysville and Sacramento via a connection to the Sacramento Valley Railroad in Folsom. Grading from Folsom to Marysville commenced in 1858 and was completed up to Grider's Ranch (Roseville) by 1859.

At Auburn Ravine, where the line makes an elbow and turns northward toward Marysville, a new railway town Lincoln was located by Judah with town lots on sale from Wilson. At an auction in Sacramento on November 23, 1859, over $4,000 was raised from the sales of lots in Lincoln, ranging from $20 to $400 for each lot. With the grading on the first division of the road from Folsom completed eighteen miles to Lincoln, track laying began at Folsom on December 30, 1859. With the help of the Chinese laborers, the company was able to complete the railroad to Lincoln on October 14, 1861. The completion of the railroad "changed the appearance of the locality, and breathed into the town the breath of life", birthing possibly the first platted railroad town in California.

At this point, due to a lack of funds, further construction on the California Central was temporarily halted and Lincoln experienced a small-scale boom as the northern terminus of this new railroad. Within a few years, however, more investors were found and the line was extended to Wheatland, in Yuba County, bringing an end to this early stage of Lincoln's development.

When most of its population and business moved on with the railroad, the town settled into a lull until the early 1870s, when rich clay deposits of the Ione Formation were discovered nearby. This led to the establishment of Gladding, McBean & Co., the pottery for which Lincoln is now famous, ushering in a new era of prosperity and growth.

Lincoln remained a sleepy town until the mid-1990s when the suburbs of Sacramento started expanding beyond nearby Roseville. The city is now experiencing a new period of growth.  2010 census, the population was 42,819, for a growth rate of 282 percent since 2000, making Lincoln the fastest-growing city in the United States over that decade.

In June 2003 the first casino in the greater Sacramento Metropolitan Area, the Thunder Valley Casino Resort, opened in Lincoln.

In 2006, Lincoln was named an All-America City by the National Civic League. It was the only California city to be named an All-America City that year and only one of the cities to receive the prestigious award.

Geography  

Lincoln is located at  (38.887121, -121.295973).

Climate  

Lincoln has a hot-summer Mediterranean climate (Köppen Csa) that is characterized by cool, wet winters and hot, dry summers. The wet season is generally October through April. Lincoln averages nearly 250 sunny days per year. Some days have even hit  and these conditions have been known to last several weeks. The cooling effect of the delta breeze from the Bay Area helps bring night temperatures down to comfortable levels. Spring and fall months are quite short transitional periods with mild temperatures. Some nights have reported below-freezing temperatures, though this is uncommon. Snowfall is extremely rare in Lincoln but it does happen.

Demographics

2010  

 2010 census Lincoln had a population of 42,819. The racial makeup of Lincoln was 34,087 (79.6%) White, 629 (1.5%) African American, 399 (0.9%) Native American, 2,663 (6.2%) Asian, 115 (0.3%) Pacific Islander, 3,125 (7.3%) from other races, and 1,801 (4.2%) from two or more races. Hispanic or Latino of any race were 7,597 persons (17.7%).

The census reported that 42,704 people (99.7% of the population) lived in households, 30 (0.1%) lived in non-institutionalized group quarters, and 85 (0.2%) were institutionalized.

There were 16,479 households, 5,190 (31.5%) had children under the age of 18 living in them, 10,365 (62.9%) were opposite-sex married couples living together, 1,202 (7.3%) had a female householder with no husband present, 586 (3.6%) had a male householder with no wife present. There were 775 (4.7%) unmarried opposite-sex partnerships, and 110 (0.7%) same-sex married couples or partnerships. 3,518 households (21.3%) were one person and 2,128 (12.9%) had someone living alone who was 65 or older. The average household size was 2.59. There were 12,153 families (73.7% of households); the average family size was 3.01.

The age distribution was 10,382 people (24.2%) under the age of 18, 2,360 people (5.5%) aged 18 to 24, 10,862 people (25.4%) aged 25 to 44, 9,166 people (21.4%) aged 45 to 64, and 10,049 people (23.5%) who were 65 or older. The median age was 40.5 years. For every 100 females, there were 92.5 males. For every 100 females aged 18 and over, there were 89.6 males.

There were 17,457 housing units at an average density of 867.2 per square mile, of the occupied units 13,115 (79.6%) were owner-occupied and 3,364 (20.4%) were rented. The homeowner vacancy rate was 2.5%; the rental vacancy rate was 4.7%. 32,473 people (75.8% of the population) lived in owner-occupied housing units and 10,231 people (23.9%) lived in rental housing units.

2000  

 2000 census there were 11,205 people in 3,874 households, including 3,033 families, in the city. The racial makeup of the city was 79.64% White, 0.44% African American, 1.26% Native American, 1.08% Asian, 0.14% Pacific Islander, 13.47% from other races, and 3.97% from two or more races. Hispanic or Latino of any race were 25.98%.

Of the 3,874 households, 40.5% had children under the age of 18 living with them, 59.5% were married couples living together, 13.3% had a female householder with no husband present, and 21.7% were non-families. Of all households, 17.2% were one person and 6.8% were one person aged 65 or older. The average household size was 2.86 and the average family size was 3.20.

The age distribution was 30.0% under the age of 18, 8.9% from 18 to 24, 30.3% from 25 to 44, 19.6% from 45 to 64, and 11.3% 65 or older. The median age was 32 years. For every 100 females, there were 95.9 males. For every 100 females aged 18 and over, there were 92.7 males.

The median income for a household in the city was $45,547, and the median family income was $51,166. Males had a median income of $38,460 versus $25,603 for females. The per capita income for the city was $19,447. About 10.3 percent of families and 12.4 percent of the population were below the poverty line, including 20.0 percent of those under age 18 and 4.7 percent of those aged 65 or over.

References

External links  

 
 

Cities in Placer County, California
Cities in Sacramento metropolitan area
Incorporated cities and towns in California
Populated places established in 1859
Populated places established in 1890
1859 establishments in California
1890 establishments in California
Paleogene California